Protocadherin beta-14 is a protein that in humans is encoded by the PCDHB14 gene.

This gene is a member of the protocadherin beta gene cluster, one of three related gene clusters tandemly linked on chromosome 5. The gene clusters demonstrate an unusual genomic organization similar to that of B-cell and T-cell receptor gene clusters.

The beta cluster contains 16 genes and 3 pseudogenes, each encoding 6 extracellular cadherin domains and a cytoplasmic tail that deviates from others in the cadherin superfamily. The extracellular domains interact in a homophilic manner to specify differential cell-cell connections.

Unlike the alpha and gamma clusters, the transcripts from these genes are made up of only one large exon, not sharing common 3' exons as expected. These neural cadherin-like cell adhesion proteins are integral plasma membrane proteins. Their specific functions are unknown but they most likely play a critical role in the establishment and function of specific cell-cell neural connections.

References

Further reading